Dorchester is an unincorporated community and the shire town of Westmorland County, New Brunswick, Canada. It held village status prior to 2023. It is named for Guy Carleton, 1st Baron Dorchester, an 18th-century Governor-General of the old Province of Quebec.

It is located on the eastern side of the mouth of the lush Memramcook River valley near the river's discharge point into Shepody Bay.  Dorchester is an English-speaking community but it is adjacent to French-speaking Acadian areas farther up the Memramcook River valley.

History

The shire town of the county, Dorchester has several fine historic homes and civic buildings most of which were built by local lawyer and Master Builder, John Francis Teed. During the 19th century, Dorchester and neighbouring Dorchester Island were important shipbuilding centres. Numerous master mariners also lived in Dorchester and vicinity during the Golden Age of Sail. Prior to rail service, it was a centre for the stagecoach, as well as a busy ship port. The community was transformed with the construction in 1872 of the Intercolonial Railway between Halifax and Rivière-du-Loup. In 1911, the village founded the Dorchester Light and Fire Company which is now known as the Dorchester Volunteer Fire Department. In 1965, the village courthouse was destroyed by arson. Many in the community came to the town square to watch the building burn. The only thing left of the courthouse was the safe. It is now used in the village hall where the courthouse once stood. The courthouse was never rebuilt, and much of the economy behind it left the community.

Dorchester was home to Edward Barron Chandler, a father of confederation and his family who built their home, Chandler House, commonly referred to as Rocklynn which is now a nationally recognized historic property.

Premier Louis Robichaud's government during the 1960s created an industrial park and deepwater loading pier at nearby Dorchester Cape as part of a regional economic development program. Envisioned to be used by the petro-chemical industry, the government constructed a new road and railway spur along with an electrical substation and the pier as well as a building that was envisioned to be used as a fertilizer plant. The industrial park had no tenants and the pier sitting in the Memramcook River was quickly silted in by mud from the tides of the Bay of Fundy. Today all that remains are the roads and the railbed as well as some broken street lights, a deteriorating sea wall and the empty shell of the abandoned fertilizer plant.

In 1998, the Dorchester Jail was also closed. It is currently a fitness gym and a bed and breakfast.

On 1 January 2023, Dorchester amalgamated with the town of Sackville and parts of three local service districts to form the new town of Tantramar. The community's name remains in official use.

Demographics 

Population trend 

Income (2015)

Mother tongue (2016)

Economy
The village's main employer today is the Correctional Service of Canada, which operates a prison complex now comprising the medium-security (once maximum-security) Dorchester Penitentiary, and the minimum-security Westmorland Institution.

Many residents commute to work in the nearby towns of Sackville and Amherst or the cities of Moncton and Dieppe.

A recent influx of residents is creating a new demand for Dorchester.

Tourism is centred on the historic and natural features of the area. One of Dorchester's most historic buildings houses the Keillor House Museum. The annual shorebird migration to the mud flats of nearby Johnson's Mills is celebrated by an oversize model of a semi-palmated sandpiper situated in the village square.

Another tourist attraction is the conversion of the Dorchester Jail to a successful bed and breakfast where you can spend a night in a real jail cell. Opened in 2017, it’s one of the Maritimes highest rated adventure Airbnb’s listed. It’s the sight of the last double hanging in New Brunswick, where the Bannister brothers were hanged and buried at the jail.

Transportation
Although situated on the CN Rail main line between Halifax and Montreal, Dorchester no longer has a passenger station, with travellers having to entrain/detrain in Sackville or Moncton. The nearest airport is the Greater Moncton International Airport, a 40 km drive in Dieppe.

Notable people

 William Henry Snyder Nickerson - Dorchester born winner of the Victoria Cross for actions performed during the Second Boer War.
 John F. Hickman - Canadian soldier, victim of the 1919 Kinmel Park riots in Wales after World War I. His parents lived in Dorchester and he is buried at Dorchester Rural Cemetery.
 Edward Barron Chandler - Father of Confederation. His family home, Chandler House, commonly referred to as Rocklynn, was later inhabited by the Teed Family.
 John Francis Teed - architect, lawyer and Master Builder, a "third-generation Loyalist [who] was one of Dorchester, New Brunswick's most celebrated master builders. Teed's reputation was sealed with the construction of Mount Allison University's Centennial College Hall (1884) and Owens Art Gallery (1895). In 1895, he supervised the expansion of St. Francis Xavier University's Xavier Hall with the addition of a new two-storey west wing. " He is an ancestor of the Teeds of Saint John.
 Douglas How (1919–2001) - journalist, magazine editor, and author.
 Sir Pierre-Amand Landry (1846–1916) - Acadian lawyer, judge and political figure.
 Sir Albert James Smith (1822–1883) - politician and opponent of Canadian confederation.
 Forbes Kennedy (1935-) - Hockey player who last played for the Toronto Maple Leafs.

See also
List of communities in New Brunswick
Greater Moncton, New Brunswick
Greater Shediac, New Brunswick

Trivia
 Dorchester appears fictionalized in Douglas How's humorous book Blow Up the Trumpet in the New Moon (1993).
 The song Dorchester by Matt Minglewood is about the Dorchester Penitentiary.
 Dorchester is home to the world's largest sandpiper.
 The Bell Inn Restaurant is one of New Brunswick's oldest surviving stone buildings, built sometime between 1811 and 1821. It is also in the book of Where To Eat In Canada.
The Dorchester Jail was the location of the last double hanging in New Brunswick, September 1936

References

Further reading
 One Village, One War, 1914-1945: A Thinking About the Literature of Stone, by Douglas Howe, Hantsport: Lancelot Press (1995). The story of Dorchester residents who served Canada in World Wars I and II. 
 Dorchester Island and Related Areas, by Reginald B. Bowser, 1986.

External links
 Village of Dorchester official website

Communities in Westmorland County, New Brunswick
Former villages in New Brunswick
Communities in Greater Moncton